Hjalmar (Jalmari) Kovanen (21 October 1877, Laukaa - 10 January 1936) was a Finnish farmer and politician. He was a member of the Parliament of Finland from 1924 to 1927 and again from 1929 to 1933, representing the Social Democratic Party of Finland (SDP).

References

1877 births
1936 deaths
People from Laukaa
People from Vaasa Province (Grand Duchy of Finland)
Social Democratic Party of Finland politicians
Members of the Parliament of Finland (1924–27)
Members of the Parliament of Finland (1929–30)
Members of the Parliament of Finland (1930–33)